Tunisia has competed since 1957 in 8 Pan Arab Games making 8 Appearances in all Games Editions. Its athletes have won a total of 801 medals.

Medal tables

Medals by Pan Arab Games

Below the table representing all Tunisian medals around the games. Till now, Tunisia has won 801 medals of whom 280 are gold medals as well Tunisia ranked Second in all time Games medal table just after Egypt.

Medals by sport

Athletes with most medals

Athletics

See also
 Tunisia at the Olympics
 Tunisia at the African Games
 Tunisia at the Mediterranean Games 
 Tunisia at the Paralympics
 Sports in Tunisia

References

External links 
 Official website

Pan Arab Games